153rd Regiment may refer to:

 153rd (Highland) Transport Regiment, a unit of the United Kingdom Territorial Army
 153rd Illinois Volunteer Infantry Regiment, a unit of the Union (North) Army during the American Civil War